Maripa is a town in the state of Bolívar, Venezuela. It is the municipal seat of the Sucre Municipality.

Populated places in Bolívar (state)